The 2022 Judo Grand Slam Tel Aviv was held in Tel Aviv, Israel, from 17 to 19 February 2022.

Event videos
The event will air freely on the IJF YouTube channel.

Medal summary

Medal table

Men's events

Women's events

Prize money
The sums written are per medalist, bringing the total prizes awarded to 154,000€.

References

External links
 

2022 IJF World Tour
2022 Judo Grand Slam
IJF World Tour Tel Aviv
Grand Slam 2022
Judo
Judo
Judo
Judo